John Joseph Mandic (October 3, 1919 – June 22, 2003) was an American professional basketball player of Croatian origin. He played college basketball for the Oregon State Beavers from 1939 to 1942. He played for the Portland Indians of the Pacific Coast Professional Basketball League in the team's debut season in 1946–47, and was drafted by the Washington Capitols in the 1947 BAA draft after the season had finished. Instead of playing for the Capitols, he instead signed with the Rochester Royals of the National Basketball League and played for the team for one season. He joined the Indianapolis Jets for the 1948–49 BAA season. He was sold to the Capitols, the team that had drafted him two years prior, on August 13, 1949. After playing 22 games with the Capitols, he was waived, and signed with the Baltimore Bullets, but only managed three games with the team before retiring from playing basketball.

BAA/NBA career statistics

Regular season

References

External links

1919 births
2003 deaths
All-American college men's basketball players
American men's basketball players
American people of Croatian descent
Baltimore Bullets (1944–1954) players
Basketball players from Los Angeles
Centers (basketball)
Indianapolis Jets players
Oregon State Beavers men's basketball players
Power forwards (basketball)
Washington Capitols draft picks
Washington Capitols players